Sam Bowen is a British professional boxer who held the British super-featherweight title from 2018 to 2019.

Professional career 

Bowen made his professional debut on 25 March 2015, scoring a first-round technical knockout (TKO) victory over Richard Walter at the Civic Hall In Bedworth, Warwickshire.

After winning his first twelve fights, eight by stoppage, Bowen fought Maxi Hughes (18–3–2) for the vacant British super-featherweight title at the King Power Stadium in Leicester, winning via eighth-round TKO.

On 6 October 2018, he faced Horacio Alfredo Cabral at the Leicester Arena. Bowen scored a fourth-round TKO victory to capture the vacant WBO Inter-Continental super-featherweight title.

Professional boxing record

References 

Living people
Year of birth missing (living people)
Date of birth missing (living people)
Boxers from Leicester
English male boxers
Super-featherweight boxers
British Boxing Board of Control champions